Arthur James Bell (6 September 1914  – 7 August 1972) was a British (Northern Irish) motorcycle road racer who became known for his short post-World War II Isle of Man TT career that came to notice with his second-place finish in the 1947 Isle of Man TT on a second-hand 500cc Norton he bought himself on which he led for three of the seven laps.

Early career
Bell began motorcycling as a teenager despite the opposition of his father, who at one time forced him to get rid of his Sunbeam motorcycle, but by 1938 Bell prevailed and rode in minor events progressing to a second-place finish in the North West 200 an event that still takes place in Northern Ireland.

Active years
Riding his 1939 Norton, he participated in several races in the immediate post-World War II period including the 1946 Cookstown 100 event where he recorded the fastest lap time of 76.60 mph and winning the 1947 500cc Ulster Grand Prix race with an average speed of 91.25 mph (146 km/h) in a time of 2 hours 43 minutes 1 second, while setting a new lap record of 94.79 mph (151.17 km/h). Bell also won the 1947 North West 200.

Following his 1947 Isle of Man performance, Norton picked him up as a works rider for the following season. He did not finish in his TT Junior 350cc race, however, the next season he claimed first place in the 500cc Senior TT race and third place in the 350cc Junior event. In 1949 he placed third and fourth in the TT as well as taking the North West 200 again. Norton introduced the Featherbed frame in 1950 contributing to his 1950 first place in the 350cc Junior race and second place in the 500cc Senior race.  Further placings in the 1950 Dutch TT and Swiss Grand Prix ensured his position in the 1950 Grand Prix season with seventh and fourth place respectively in the 500cc and 350cc championship standings. Bell also claimed the North West 200 for a third time.

Unfortunately, his promising racing career came to an end following a high speed crash during the 1950 season at La Source Hairpin during the 1950 Belgian Grand Prix at the extremely fast Spa-Francorchamps circuit.  The accident occurred during the 500cc race when the leader Carlo Bandirola was being followed by Les Graham and Bell.  When Bandirola braked early for the La Source Hairpin, a collision occurred when the AJS Porcupine motorcycle ridden by Graham hit the rear-wheel of motorcycle ridden by Bandirola. Although, Graham was thrown clear, Bell hit the AJS Porcupine and machines collided at high speed with a timing-post at La Source Hairpin.  Bell was unable to race again even though he survived serious injury.

He died on 7 August 1972 at his home in County Down. In 1996 the Irish Post Office issued a set postage stamps of notable Irish motorcyclists that included a stamp depicting Artie Bell.  Also in 1996, the Isle of Man Post Office issued a set of post stamps of Irish Isle of Man TT winners including Artie Bell's win during the 1950 Junior TT race.

Motor-Cycle Grand Prix results
FIM World Motor-Cycle Championship

See also
 1949 Grand Prix motorcycle racing season
 1950 Grand Prix motorcycle racing season
 1950 Isle of Man TT
 List of people on stamps of Ireland

Sources

External links
Artie Bell short biography
1946-1949 Cookstown 100 results Wayback Machine archive
Culture Northern Ireland

Sportspeople from Belfast
British motorcycle racers
Motorcycle racers from Northern Ireland
500cc World Championship riders
Isle of Man TT riders
1914 births
1972 deaths